Menoky (or Menoki) is a title of Nair in the Indian state of Kerala. The Menoky are one of 14 "high caste" Nayar (there are 4 "low caste" Nair sub-castes), and historically served as administrators and feudal landlords.

References

Nair